Elisha Lee (1870 - August 6, 1933) was Vice President of the Pennsylvania Railroad and later Chairman of the Managers Committee of the Railroads.

References

External links
 

1870 births
1933 deaths
Pennsylvania Railroad people
20th-century American railroad executives